Anthony Island may refer to:
Anthony Island, Newfoundland and Labrador, Canada
Anthony Island (British Columbia), Queen Charlotte Islands, British Columbia, Canada